Paul Osipow (born 1939) is an artist from Finland. He studied in Academy of Fine Arts and  Vapaa taidekoulu in Helsinki and in 
University of Texas, Austin, USA 

Osipow made his breakthrough in Finnish art world in 1960, and his career  has continued for decades. He used to paint with acrylic, but changed to oil paintings. Osipow became first famous with his pop-art paintings. 
Osipow’s exhibitions in the 1990s revealed his gradual movement away from a pure geometric expression to one more painterly and unrestricted, inspired by the pioneers of modern painting and with extensive samplings from late impressionism, cubism and fauvism.

He received the Swedish Prince Eugen Medal in 1989.

References

External links 
 Osipow's works Finnish National Gallery

1939 births
Living people
20th-century Finnish painters
21st-century Finnish painters
21st-century male artists
Finnish male painters
20th-century Finnish male artists
Members of the Royal Swedish Academy of Arts